Masala Republic is a 2014 Indian Malayalam-language dystopian political satirical spoof film directed by Visakh G. S. in his directorial debut. It stars an ensemble cast consisting of Indrajith Sukumaran, Aparna Nair, Sunny Wayne, Captain Raju, P. Balachandran, Mamukkoya, Shine Tom Chacko, Vinayakan, Vinay Forrt and Mala Aravindan. The story and dialogue of the film is by the director, while the screenplay was co-written by Arungeorge K. David.

The film is produced by Sukumar Thekkepat under the banner of Chemmeen Cinema. The music is composed by Jassie Gift and Kolkata based band Mrittika while the background scores are by the Widvaan band. Suresh Rajan is behind the camera while Manoj Kannoth did the editing works of the film and songs were choreographed by Imithiyas Aboobacker. The film was released on 25 April 2014. The film mainly received negative reviews at that time.  because at that time, Indian audience don't have taste in Spoof films. But later, the film was considered as one of the best Experimental film in Malayalam.

Cast 

 Indrajith Sukumaran as S.I. Shambu, Circle Inspector Anti Gutka Squad
 Aparna Nair as Shreya, TV Reporter
 Sunny Wayne as Bada Bhai, Perumbavoor based mafia don
 Vinayakan as Bengali Babu, a labour supplier 
 Soubin Shahir as Althaf
 Sreenath Bhasi as Anto
 Vinay Forrt as Ambu
 Shine Tom Chacko as Sivan Kutty
Amith Chakalakkal as AGS Officer Firoz
Chemban Vinod Jose as M.L.A Perumbavoor Ajayan
 P. Balachandran as Pattanam Balan
Rajesh Sharma as Sudhakaran Thuruthy
 Mamukkoya as Beeranikka
 Mala Aravindan as Rappayichan
 Captain Raju as Chinese Chandran
 Vijay Kumar as Prince
 Sumangal as Sanju Bhai
 Rupesh Bhimta as Bhimta
 Anfas Ansary as Pempa
 Srinda Arhaan as AGS Officer Nagavally
 Kani Kusruti as AGS Officer Kani
 Pavithra Menon as Akhila Varma
 Sobhana George as Exicse Minister

Music

Release 
The trailer of the film was released on 23 March 2014.   The film was scheduled to be a 25 April 2014 release.

References

External links

http://entertainment.oneindia.in/malayalam/news/2013/indrajith-plays-lead-movie-masala-republic-124539.html

External links
 

2010s Malayalam-language films
Films scored by Jassie Gift